A reamer is a type of cutting tool used in metalworking.

Reamer may also refer to:

Reamer, West Virginia
Citrus reamer, a utensil for extracting juice from citrus fruits

People with the surname Reamer:
Cory Reamer (born 1987), American football linebacker
George W. Reamer (1864–1938), American mining engineer and builder
Robert Reamer (1873–1938), American architect

See also
Ream (disambiguation)